Miloš Jelínek (born 10 March 1947) is a former Czech cyclist. He competed in three cycling events at the 1968 Summer Olympics.

References

1947 births
Living people
Czech male cyclists
Olympic cyclists of Czechoslovakia
Cyclists at the 1968 Summer Olympics
Sportspeople from Brno